Renard Hill is a mountain located in the Catskill Mountains of New York northeast of Downsville, New York. Conklin Hill is located northeast, and Prospect Hill is located north-northwest of Renard Hill.

References

Mountains of Delaware County, New York
Mountains of New York (state)